Rhanidophora is a genus of moths of the family Erebidae. The genus was described by Wallengren in 1858.

Species

Rhanidophora aethiops Grünberg, 1907
Rhanidophora agrippa H. Druce, 1899
Rhanidophora albigutta Fawcett, 1915
Rhanidophora aurantiaca Hampson, 1902
Rhanidophora cinctigutta Walker, 1862
Rhanidophora enucleata Mabille, 1900
Rhanidophora flava Bethune-Baker, 1911
Rhanidophora flavigutta Hampson, 1926
Rhanidophora phedonia Stoll, 1782
Rhanidophora odontophora Hampson, 1926
Rhanidophora piguerator Hampson, 1926
Rhanidophora ridens Hampson, 1902
Rhanidophora septipunctata Bethune-Baker, 1909

References

Calpinae